"Bleed" is a song by American rapper A Boogie wit da Hoodie, and the fourth single from his third studio album, Artist 2.0 (2020). It was released on June 16, 2020, and appears on the deluxe edition of the album. The song was produced by S.Dot and JoeFromYO.

Background
According to A Boogie wit da Hoodie, the song was originally intended to be a collaboration with the rapper Pop Smoke, who died before A Boogie could present it to him.

Composition
Aaron Williams of Uproxx described the song as "ominous" and more "aggressive". "Bleed" finds A Boogie wit da Hoodie melodically rapping about valuing wealth and materialistic possessions over love, over a "sinister" drill instrumental produced by S.Dot and JoeFromYO, consisting of "haunting keys and sliding 808s".

Charts

Certifications

References

2020 singles
2020 songs
A Boogie wit da Hoodie songs
Songs written by A Boogie wit da Hoodie
Atlantic Records singles